Church of the Holy Cross is a Croatian Pre-Romanesque Catholic church originating from the 9th century in Nin.

Description
According to a theory from an art historian Mladen Pejaković, the design has an intentionally unbalanced elliptical form designated to "follow" the position of the Sun, retaining the functionality of a calendar and sundial. In its beginning, in the time of the Croatian principality, it was used as a royal chapel of the duke's courtyard nearby.

The church is that of a central type, it features the Croatian interlace (or simply "troplet") and a carved name of the župan of Nin "Godečaj".

The church is known under the moniker of "the smallest cathedral in the world", but it does not actually contain the seat of a bishop of Nin today.

Gallery

See also 

Nin, Croatia
Church of St. Nicholas, Nin
Architecture of Croatia
Church of St. Donatus
Church of Holy Salvation, Cetina

References

Churches in Croatia
9th-century establishments in Croatia
Medieval architecture
Buildings and structures in Zadar County
Pre-Romanesque architecture in Croatia
Tourist attractions in Zadar County